Prudential borrowing is the set of rules governing local authority borrowing in the UK. Under prudential borrowing, the amount of debt and other liabilities most local authorities can incur is no longer capped by an upper limit. Instead borrowing must conform to the Prudential Code which (among other things) requires that borrowing be affordable and prudential.

Local government in the United Kingdom